Duress is the coercion of someone to act against their will.

Duress may also refer to:
 Duress in American law
 Duress in English law
 Duress (film)
 "Duress", an episode of Revenge